Indian Creek High School is a public high school in Wintersville, Ohio. It is the only secondary school in the Indian Creek Local School District. Athletic teams compete as the Indian Creek Redskins in the Ohio High School Athletic Association as a member of the Buckeye 8 Athletic League as well as the Ohio Valley Athletic Conference.

History
In the late 1960s, the school formerly known as Wintersville High School consolidated with Wayne High School in Bloomingdale, Ohio. The former Wayne Wolves remained but as an elementary school while the high school combined with the  Jr. High (Buchanan Braves) and Sr. High school (Wintersville Warriors). In 1993, the Indian Creek Local School District consolidated with Mingo Junction, which resulted in the closing of Mingo Sr. High School. The Mingo students were transferred into Wintersville Sr High School, creating Indian Creek High School. The old Mingo high school was made into Indian Creek Junior High, before moving into the new middle school in January 2013. Mingo's nickname was changed from the Indians and the combined schools became the Indian Creek Redskins. Although both Wintersville and Mingo's High school voted for the colors to be black and blue, the executive decision was made by the school board to go with Gold and Red against the populus of the two communities.

Academics
Indian Creek High School employs over 150 teachers, two of which are in the Ohio High School Teacher Hall of Fame.

Athletics
The Indian Creek Redskins compete in the Buckeye 8 of the OHSAA.
Indian Creek has many athletics in which students may participate including band, cheerleading, football, soccer, volleyball, cross country, golf, basketball, wrestling, baseball, softball, tennis and track.

OVAC Conference Championships
Baseball - 2003
Boys Basketball - 2001, 2008
Girls Basketball - 2008, 2009, 2010
Boys Cross Country - 1996
Football - 1995, 1996, 2012, 2018, 2019
Golf - 2000, 2001, 2002, 2003, 2004, 2005
Boys Soccer - 1995
Softball - 1997, 1998
Boys Tennis - 1996
Volleyball - 1997, 1998, 1999, 2000, 2001, 2013
Wrestling - 2016

Buckeye 8 Conference Championships
Girls Basketball - 2013
Boys Cross Country - 2012
Football - 2011, 2016, 2018
Girls Track and field - 2017

See also
Native American mascot controversy
Sports teams named Redskins

References

External links
Indian Creek District Website
Indian Creek athletics
ICHS Sports Fan Site

High schools in Jefferson County, Ohio
Public high schools in Ohio